Eteobalea vinsoni is a moth in the family Cosmopterigidae. It is found on Mauritius and Réunion in the Indian Ocean.

Subspecies
Eteobalea vinsoni vinsoni (Viette, 1953) - from Mauritius
Eteobalea vinsoni abcedella (Viette, 1957) - from Réunion

References
Viette, P. 1953c. Description de deux nouveaux microlépidoptères de l'Ile Maurice. - Bulletin de la Société zoologique de France 78(2–3):138–141.
Viette, P. 1957c. Lépidoptères (excepté les Tordeuses et les Géométrides). – In: La Faune entomologique de l'Ile de la Réunion. I. - Mémoires de l'Institut scientifique de Madagascar (E)8:137–226; pls. 1–4.

Eteobalea
Moths described in 1953